Fernando Torres Graciano (born 27 August 1970) is a Mexican politician affiliated with the PAN. He currently serves as Senator of the LXII Legislature of the Mexican Congress representing Guanajuato, and previously served in the Congress of Guanajuato.

References

1970 births
Living people
Politicians from Guanajuato
People from León, Guanajuato
Members of the Senate of the Republic (Mexico)
National Action Party (Mexico) politicians
21st-century Mexican politicians
Members of the Congress of Guanajuato
Senators of the LXII and LXIII Legislatures of Mexico